De Los Valles y Volcanes is the first full-length album of the Argentine post-rock band Hacia Dos Veranos released in May 2007 by Scatter Records.

Track list 
 24:00 (4:19)
 Preludio (5:12)
 Sueño (6:00)
 La Última Tarde Del Apicultor (4:16)
 Maleficio (6:16)
 Orillas Del Aluminé (2:35)
 Despertar (1:56)
 De Los Valles y Volcanes (9:33)
 Verano (3:32)

 All tracks were arranged and composed by Ignacio Aguiló, Diego Martínez and Sebastián Henderson.

Notes 
 Tracks Preludio, Sueño and Despertar, were recorded by Sebastián Rilo in Estudio Tecson.
 Track La Última Tarde Del Apicultor was recorded by Juan Stewart in Estudio El Árbol.
 Tracks 24:00, Maleficio, Orillas Del Aluminé, De Los Valles y Volcanes and Verano were recorded by Norman McLoughlin in Estudio Concreto.
 Mixed by Juan Stewart and Hacia Dos Veranos in Estudio El Árbol.
 Cover design was in charge of Santiago Schroeder with collaboration of Mauricio Heredia.
 The Enhanced CD features the videoclip of the track Preludio, which was directed by Mariano Baez and Franco Estrubia.

Performers

Hacia Dos Veranos
Ignacio Aguiló: guitar
Diego Martínez: bass
Julia Bayse: flute, keyboards
Andrés Edelstein: drums

Others musicians 
Ignacio Gabriel: Farfisa keyboard on tracks Maleficio, De Los Valles y Volcanes and Verano.

References

External links 
Hacia Dos Veranos' Official Website
Hacia Dos Veranos' MySpace

Scatter Records

2005 debut albums